In Greek mythology, Aristomachus (Ancient Greek: Ἀριστόμαχος, Ἀristómakhos) may refer to several figures including:
 Aristomachus, one of the sons of Talaus. He is the father of Hippomedon.
 Aristomachus, one of the Heracleidae, son of Cleodaeus, a great-grandson of Heracles. He led an attempt to capture Mycenae during the reign of Tisamenus, but, having misinterpreted the oracle, failed and fell in the battle. He is the father of Temenus, Cresphontes and Aristodemus.
 Aristomachus, one of the suitors of Hippodamia before Pelops, was killed by Oenomaus.

Notes

References 

 Apollodorus, The Library with an English Translation by Sir James George Frazer, F.B.A., F.R.S. in 2 Volumes, Cambridge, MA, Harvard University Press; London, William Heinemann Ltd. 1921. ISBN 0-674-99135-4. Online version at the Perseus Digital Library. Greek text available from the same website.
Herodotus, The Histories with an English translation by A. D. Godley. Cambridge. Harvard University Press. 1920. Online version at the Topos Text Project. Greek text available at Perseus Digital Library
 Pausanias, Description of Greece with an English Translation by W.H.S. Jones, Litt.D., and H.A. Ormerod, M.A., in 4 Volumes. Cambridge, MA, Harvard University Press; London, William Heinemann Ltd. 1918. . Online version at the Perseus Digital Library
Pausanias, Graeciae Descriptio. 3 vols. Leipzig, Teubner. 1903.  Greek text available at the Perseus Digital Library.
 William Smith's Dictionary of Greek and Roman Biography and Mythology: Aristomachus

Heracleidae
Argive characters in Greek mythology
Elean mythology